De Vries Palisade, also known as DeVries Palisade of 1631, is an archaeological site located at Lewes, Sussex County, Delaware. It is the site of the Zwaanendael Colony, the first permanent European presence on the Delaware Bay in 1631, settled by a group of settlers under David Pietersz. de Vries.  The settlers landed near this spot to form a whale hunting station and agricultural settlement. A monument was erected on the site; it was dedicated on September 22, 1909.

It was listed on the National Register of Historic Places in 1972.

See also
Zwaanendael Museum

References

External links
"DeVries Monument in Lewes," by Hazel D. Brittingham, 1997

Archaeological sites on the National Register of Historic Places in Delaware
Geography of Sussex County, Delaware
Buildings and structures in Lewes, Delaware
National Register of Historic Places in Sussex County, Delaware